Names is a quarterly peer-reviewed academic journal that is devoted to the scholarly investigation of names and naming (onomastics). Established in 1952, this open-access journal is published by the University of Pittsburgh. It is the official journal of the American Name Society. The Editor-in-Chief is Professor I. M. Nick, Past President of the American Name Society.

References

External links

Onomastics
Taylor & Francis academic journals
Publications established in 1952
Quarterly journals
English-language journals
Academic journals associated with learned and professional societies of the United States
Linguistics journals